National Museums Scotland (NMS) is an executive non-departmental public body of the Scottish Government. It runs the national museums of Scotland.

NMS is one of the country's National Collections, and holds internationally important collections of natural sciences, decorative arts, world cultures, science and technology, and Scottish history and archaeology.

List of national museums
 The National Museum of Scotland, comprising two linked museums on Chambers Street, in the Old Town of Edinburgh:
 The Museum of Scotland - concerned with the history and people of Scotland
 The Royal Museum - a general museum encompassing global geology, archaeology, natural history, science, technology and art
 The National Museum of Flight, at East Fortune, East Lothian
 The National Museum of Rural Life, at Wester Kittochside farm, in South Lanarkshire (previously the Museum of Scottish Country Life, previously the Scottish Agricultural Museum)
 The National War Museum, at Edinburgh Castle

Other collections
The main storage building at the National Museums Collection Centre, at Granton in Edinburgh, opened in 1996. It is open to the public for guided tours. A new storage building has been constructed, which houses the textile and costume collections, including the Jean Muir Collection of 20th century costume and accessories.

The National Museum of Costume was located at Shambellie House, in New Abbey, Dumfries and Galloway, Scotland. In January 2013, National Museums Scotland announced that the National Museum of Costume was to close and the site would not reopen for 2013.

Trustees
National Museums Scotland is Scotland's national museum service, governed by a board of trustees. It is a non-departmental public body, funded by the Education and Lifelong Learning Directorate of the Scottish Government.

Notable items in the national collections 

The official website lists the following exhibits as being the highlights of its collections:
Assyrian relief of King Ashurnasirpal II and a court official, from the North-West Palace of Ashurnasirpal at Nimrud, excavated by Austen Henry Layard in the 1840s; the medical pioneer James Young Simpson gave the panel to the Society of Antiquaries of Scotland, who passed it into the national collection
Boulton & Watt engine
Bute mazer (also referred to as the Bannatyne mazer)
Calcite crystal, found in 1927 at the New Glencrieff mine at Wanlockhead on the Leadhills ore field, "an excellent example of a complex doubly terminated scalenohedral crystal" (see Dogtooth spar)
Concorde G-BOAA (Alpha Alpha)
Dolly the sheep
Galloway Hoard
Hunterston Brooch
Lewis chessmen
One of the three skins left of the Mauritius blue pigeon
Monymusk reliquary
Queen Mary harp
Qurneh burial collection, discovered by Flinders Petrie on 30 December 1908, the only complete ancient royal Egyptian burial collection held outside Egypt
Seringapatam sword, presented to David Baird by his field officers after the Battle of Seringapatam, in May 1799
Silver travelling canteen of Prince Charles Edward Stuart
Talnotrie Hoard
Tea Service of the Emperor Napoleon

See also
 Museums in Scotland
 National Museums of the United Kingdom
 National Museums Northern Ireland

References

External links
 National Museums Scotland, organisation website

 
Executive non-departmental public bodies of the Scottish Government
Scottish Government Learning and Justice Directorate
Natural history museums in Scotland
Book publishing companies of Scotland
Archives in Scotland
Charities based in Edinburgh
National museums of Scotland
Research organisations in Scotland